Agustín Pío Barrios (also known as Agustín Barrios Mangoré and Nitsuga—Agustin spelled backward—Mangoré; May 5, 1885 – August 7, 1944) was a Paraguayan virtuoso classical guitarist and composer, largely regarded as one of the greatest performers and most prolific composers for the guitar.

Biography

Birthplace
It has been generally accepted that Barrios was born in San Juan Bautista, Paraguay. However, there is no definitive proof of this as his baptismal document found in the book of registries in the cathedral in San Juan Bautista does not state his precise place of birth. Also, several biographers and authorities present convincing documented evidence that Barrios was actually born in the nearby town of Villa Florida, Misiones, situated on the Tebicuary River some 30  km north of San Juan Bautista. His diplomatic papers found in 2019 did not shed any light on this question as they listed only "Missiones" as the place of birth.

Early life
As a child, Barrios developed a love of music and literature, two arts that were very important to his family. Barrios would eventually speak two languages (Spanish and Guarani), and read three others (English, French, and German).

Barrios began to show an interest in musical instruments, particularly the guitar, before he reached his teens. He went to Asunción in 1900, at the age of fifteen, to attend Colegio Nacional de Asunción, thus becoming one of the youngest university students in Paraguayan history. Apart from his studies in the music department, Barrios was highly appreciated by members of the mathematics, journalism and literature departments. He was a skilled graphic artist and worked for a time in the Agricultura bank and the Paraguayan Naval office.

After leaving the Colegio Nacional, Barrios dedicated his life to music, poetry, and travel. He composed more than 100 original works and arranged another 200 works of other composers. Barrios made several friends during his many trips across South America. He was known for giving his friends and fans signed copies of his poems. As a consequence, there are several versions of his poetical works that have surfaced across the Americas. Many current collectors warn potential buyers to be careful when they come across a work reportedly autographed by Barrios because of known forgeries.

Career

Barrios was famed for his phenomenal performances, both live and on gramophone recordings. Eye-witness testimony from Lope Texera in Caracas Venezuela on April 18, 1932, declared that Barrios was "superior to Segovia whom I saw in London last year". Barrios has been credited as the first classical guitarist to make recordings, in 1909/10, but the earliest known recording were by guitarists Luis and Simon Ramirez, onto cylinders, for the "Viuda de Aramburo" label, in Madrid, between 1897 and 1901. Barrios sometimes performed in concert in traditional Paraguayan dress (he was partly of Guaraní origin), beginning in 1932 using the pseudonym of Nitsuga Mangoré ('Nitsuga' being Agustín spelled backwards, and 'Mangoré' being the name of a cacique of the South American indigenous group Timbú).

His works were largely late-Romantic in character, despite his having lived well into the twentieth century. Many of them are also adaptations of, or are influenced by, South American and Central American folk music. Many of them are considered virtuosic.

The Johann Sebastian Bach-inspired La Catedral, from 1921, is widely considered to be Barrios' magnum opus, even winning the approval of Andrés Segovia, who said "In 1921 in Buenos Aires, I played at the hall La Argentina noted for its good acoustics for guitar, where Barrios had concertized just weeks before me. He was presented to me by his secretary Elbio Trapani. At my invitation Barrios visited me at the hotel and played for me upon my very own guitar several of his compositions among which the one that really impressed me was a magnificent concert piece The Cathedral whose first movement is an andante, like an introduction and prelude, and a second very virtuosic piece which is ideal for the repertory of any concert guitarist. Barrios had promised to send me immediately a copy of the work (I had ten days remaining before continuing my journey) but I never received a copy." However, it is equally possible that Segovia did receive the score and chose not to play it, either out of distaste for Barrios' folk-based music or professional jealousy (because Barrios was more of a composer than he was).

Later life and death

After touring Europe in 1934-35, Barrios performed in Venezuela, Haiti, Cuba, Costa Rica, Nicaragua, El Salvador and Guatemala. Several writers have suggested that Barrios revisited Mexico in 1939, but his immigration file with the Mexican government did not include an entry for him or his wife Gloria that year. He fulfilled his dream to reach the United States after getting an entry visa at the US Embassy in Maracaibo Venezuela on December 23, 1936. Ship passenger lists reveal that Barrios and his wife travelled as diplomats and arrived in Puerto Rico, a US territory, in January 1937.

He reportedly suffered a myocardial infarction in front of the US Embassy in Guatemala City on October 27,1939, after it was discovered that he was travelling with phony diplomatic papers issued by his lifetime friend and Patron Tomas Salomoni. Having recently been in Germany, at the lead-in to the Second World War, Barrios was never again able to use his diplomatic connections. He was sent an invitation to leave Guatemala because of his political leanings. He accepted the invitation of Maximiliano Hernández Martínez, then President of El Salvador, to move to El Salvador and take up a position in the Conservatory and Declamation Rafael Olmedo.

He was never to leave El Salvador. Past biographers suggested that, on August 7, 1944, he suffered a second myocardial infarction which caused his death, but this is still undetermined. A forensic physician has suggested that his death was more likely due to poisoning. At the time, Barrios' wife was carrying on an open affair with the Italian coffee plantation owner Pasquale Cosarelli, who was also residing in the Barrios household. Cosarelli was soon to marry Barrios' widow, and had both the motive and the chemicals to carry out the murder. Barrios was buried at Cementerio de Los Ilustres, having been carried there in the hottest week of the year on the shoulders of his students. In the hours after his death, his handwritten scores were stolen by his students along with his scrapbooks.

Legacy

Twelve "Mangoreanos"
During his career, Barrios taught his patrons Luis Pasquet, Martin Borda Pagola, Dionisio Basualdo, Bautista and Lalyta Almiron, and Raul Borges. Following his extensive travels in Brazil, while he was an active performer and beginning in 1940, he wrote his guitar method to provide guitar instruction after arriving in El Salvador to selected students, mostly of Salvadoran nationality. They were known as the Twelve Mangoreanos:

Luis Mario Samayoa ( -1969), Benjamín Cisneros ( -1987), Rubén Urquilla ( -1993), René Cortés-Andrino ( -1995), Mario Cardona Lazo ( -1999), Jesús Quiroa ( -2001), Jose Cándido Morales ( -2002), Julio Cortés-Andrino ( -2006), Cecilio Orellana ( -2007), Roberto Bracamontes ( -2007), Víctor Urrutia ( -2010) and Elena Valdivieso.
 
Jose Cándido Morales and Roberto Bracamonte were the only ones to learn from Barrios as live-in students in the Barrios home, which functioned as a boarding house. After Barrios' death, Morales remained the keeper of Barrios' legacy, technique and late works.

Folk music
The folk music of Paraguay (including the polca paraguaya and vals) provided the young Barrios with his first introduction to music. In 1898, Barrios was formally introduced to the classical guitar repertoire by Gustavo Sosa Escalada. At that time, Barrios may have already composed works for the guitar, and also performed pieces written by his other composers, such as La Chinita and La Perezosa. Under the influence of his new teacher, Barrios went on to perform and study the works of Tárrega, Viñas, Sor and Aguado. Sosa Escalada was so impressed with his new pupil that he convinced Barrios's parents to let him move to Asunción to continue his education. Having already surpassed the technical and performing abilities of most guitarists, Barrios began seriously to compose around 1905.

Among the folkloric influences, Barrios is known to have played such popular Paraguayan works as "Campamento Cerro León", "Londón Carapé", "Guyrá campana", "Mamá Cumandá". As an example, "Guyrá campana" is very interesting, since some of the material can be heard in parts of Barrios' recording of "Caazapá — Aire Popular Paraguayo". Though "Guyrá campana" is traditional music, many maintain that it is very closely related to guitarist Carlos Talavera (from Caazapá), whom Barrios knew.
There are various versions of "Guyrá campana" (it is also known as "Pájaro campana") e.g. for Paraguayan harp (Félix Pérez Cardozo); in some versions, the birdsong imitations can be very clearly heard.

Composer

Barrios's compositions can be divided into three basic categories: folkloric, imitative and religious. Barrios paid tribute to the music and people of his native land by composing pieces modeled after folk songs from South America and Central America. Implementing the compositional style and techniques of the Baroque and Romantic periods was another side to his craftsmanship. Una Limosna por el Amor de Dios (Alms for the Love of God) is an example of a religiously-inspired work.

Discography
 Agustin Barrios: The Complete Guitar Recordings 1913–1942 – 3-CD set transferred and digitally remastered from 78-rpm gramophone recordings from Atlanta, Odeon, Artigas labels and some of Barrios' personal home recordings.
 Agustín Barrios: Complete Music for Solo Guitar – a 6-CD-box released by Brilliant Classics in 2010

Works

Over 300 of Barrios' compositions and arrangements survive.  He is still revered in Latin America to this day, where he is seen as one of the greatest musicians of all time by many. John Williams, former student of Andres Segovia, said of Barrios: "As a guitarist/composer, Barrios is the best of the lot, regardless of era. His music is better formed, it's more poetic, it's more everything! And it's more of all those things in a timeless way."

Outstanding pieces in his repertoire include:

 Abrí la Puerta Mi China
 Aconquija (Aire de Quena)
 Aire de Zamba
 Aire Popular Paraguayo
 Aires Andaluces
 Aires Criollos
 Aires Mudéjares (fragment)
 Aire Sureño (fragment)
 Allegro Sinfónico
 Altair
 A Mi Madre-serenata
 Arabescos
 Armonías de América
 Bicho Feo
 Canción de la Hilandera
 Capricho Español
 Choro da Saudade
 Confesión (Confissao de Amor)
 Contemplación
 Córdoba
 Cueca (Danza Chilena)
 Danza en Re Menor
 Danza Guaraní
 Danza Paraguaya no.1
 Danza Paraguaya no.2 'Jha, che valle'
 Danza Paraguaya (duet version)
 Diana Guaraní
 Dinora
 Divagación en Imitación al Violín
 Divagaciones Criollas
 Don Perez Freire
 El Sueño de la Muñequita
 Escala y Preludio
 Estilo Uruguayo
 Estilo
 Estudio de Concierto No.1 in A major
 Estudio de Concierto No.2 in A major
 Estudio del Ligado in A major
 Estudio del Ligado in D minor
 Estudio en Arpegio
 Estudio en Si Menor (solo and duet)
 Estudio en Sol Menor
 Estudio Inconcluso
 Estudio No. 3
 Estudio No. 6
 Estudio Para Ambas Manos
 Estudio Vals
 Fabiniana
 Gavota al Estilo Antiguo
 Habanera
 Humoresque
 Invocación a Mi Madre
 Jha, Che Valle
 Julia Florida (barcarola)
 Junto a tu Corazón
 Jota
 La Bananita (tango)
 La Catedral:  Preludio – Andante – Allegro
 La Samaritana
 Las Abejas
 Leyenda de España
 Leyenda Guarani
 London Carapé
 Luz Mala
 Mabelita
 Madrecita
 Madrigal Gavota
 Maxixe
 Mazurka Apasionata
 Medallón Antiguo
 Milonga
 Minuet in A major
 Minuet in A major
 Minuet in B major
 Minuet in C major
 Minuet in C minor
 Minuet in E major
 Oración (Oración de la Tarde)
 Oración por Todos
 Pepita
 Pericón in F
 Pericón in G
 Preludio Op. 5, No. 1
 Preludio in E major
 Preludio in A minor
 Preludio in C major
 Preludio in C minor
 Preludio in D minor
 Preludio in E minor
 Romanza en Imitación al Violoncello (Página d¹ Album, Fuegos Fátuos)
 Sargento Cabral
 Sarita
 Serenata Morisca
 Tango No. 1
 Tango No. 2
 Tarantella (Recuerdos de Nápoles)
 Tua Imagem
 Una Limosna por el Amor de Dios (Also known as "El ultimo trémolo" or "El último canto")
 Un Sueño en la Floresta (Souvenir d¹un Reve)
 Vals de Primavera
 Vals Op. 8, No. 1 (Junto a tu Corazon)
 Vals Op. 8, No. 2
 Vals Op. 8, No. 3
 Vals Op. 8, No. 4
 Vals Tropical
 Variaciones sobre un Tema de Tárrega
 Variaciones sobre el Punto Guanacasteco
 Vidalita con variaciones in A minor
 Vidalita in D minor
 Villancico de Navidad
 Zapateado Caribe (trio)

He also wrote a couple of poems:
 Mi Guitarra
 El Bohemio

Instruments
While in Paraguay, Barrios had access only to instruments of limited quality. However, soon after his arrival in Buenos Aires in 1910, he was exposed to, and played, the finest instruments of his time for the remainder of his career. Barrios normally  traveled with two guitars, and had several modified with the addition of a 20th fret. He is documented by photograph to have played the instruments of Spanish luthiers Manuel Ramirez, José Ramírez I, Enrique García, Francisco Simplicio, Domingo Esteso, Enrique Sanfeliu and Ricardo Sanchis Nacher, Brazilian maker Di Giorgio, and in print by Uruguayan maker Rodolfo Camacho.

Film
On August 21, 2015, the film Mangoré – For the Love of Art was released in Asunción, based loosely on the life of Agustin Barrios, with a script and direction by the Chilean filmmaker Luis R. Vera. The guitarist was played by the Mexican actor Damián Alcázar and the Paraguayan actor Celso Franco, star of 7 Boxes. The music in the soundtrack was played by the Paraguayan guitarist Berta Rojas. The concert scenes were filmed using a guitar by Mexican guitar maker Federico Sheppard.

Bibliography
 Carlos Salcedo Centurion, El Inalcanzable Agustín Barrios Mangoré, 2007
 Richard D. Stover, Six Silver Moonbeams: The Life and Times of Agustin Barrios Mangoré, GSP (GSP210)
Sila Godoy, Luis Szarán, Mangoré: Vida y Obra de Agustín Barrios, Editorial Don Bosco/Ñanduti Vive, Asunción, Paraguay
 Nicolás T. Riveros, Dos almas musicales: Agustín Pío Barrios y José del Rosario Diarte, Asunción, Paraguay
 Bacón Duarte Prado, Agustín Barrios, un genio insular. Editorial Araverá, Asunción del Paraguay, 1985 
 Richard Pinnell, Frederick Sheppard, The Diary of Agustin Barrios
 Frederick Sheppard, Ramses Calderon, El Libro de Oro (vol. 1–6), Les Productions d'Oz

References

External links

Biography
 Agustín Pío Barrios. Archivo Paraguayo de la Música Centro Cultural de la República – El Cabildo, Asunción, Paraguay 
 Mario Serio, Le incisioni discografiche di Agustin Barrios 
Luis Szarán, Barrios Agustín (Mangoré), Diccionario de la Música en el Paraguay 
 Pagina Cultural del Paraguay: Breve Recordación a Mangoré. Agustín Pío Barrios  
 Agustín Barrios Mangoré: The Folkloric, Imitative, and the Religious Influence Behind His Compositions – a review essay by Johnna Jeong

Other
 Guitar of Barrios
 Agustin Barrios International Guitar Competition (Nuoro, Italy)
 
 Augustín Barrios recordings at the Discography of American Historical Recordings.

1885 births
1944 deaths
19th-century male musicians
19th-century musicians
20th-century composers
20th-century guitarists
20th-century male musicians
20th-century indigenous people of the Americas
Romantic composers
Composers for the classical guitar
Male classical composers
Paraguayan composers
Paraguayan classical guitarists
Paraguayan people of Guarani descent
Guaraní people
People from Misiones Department
Male guitarists